This article contains information about the First Cabinet of Vladimir Putin, in effect from 16 August 1999 to 7 May 2000. It was followed by Mikhail Kasyanov's Cabinet.

Ministers

References

Putin
Vladimir Putin
1999 establishments in Russia
2000 disestablishments in Russia
Cabinets established in 1999
Cabinets disestablished in 2000